Demirköprü is a station on İZBAN's Northern Line. Demirköprü is the first station west of the Karşıyaka tunnel.

References

Railway stations in İzmir Province
Railway stations opened in 2001
2001 establishments in Turkey